Luciana Turina (born 13 August 1946) is an Italian singer, actress and television personality.

Life and career 
Born in Malavicina di Roverbella,  Province of Mantua, Turina started her professional career as singer in 1965, participating at the Castrocaro Music Festival and winning the competition with the song "Come ti vorrei".  One year later, she entered the main competition at the Sanremo Music Festival, with the song "Dipendesse da me". In 1969 she made her film debut in Pietro Germi's Serafino and from then she focused her career on acting, mainly playing comedic roles. Her variegated career also includes television variety shows, cabaret and several books.

Discography

LP 
 1972 - Perché qualcuno un giorno mi ha dato la vita e... una voce (Cinevox, SC 1074)

EP 
 1966 - Dio come ti amo/Dependes de mi/La carta vincente/Nadia me puede juzgar (Compagnia Generale del Disco, HG 77-40; with Gigliola Cinquetti, Gino Paoli and Caterina Caselli; published in Spain)

Songs 
 1965 - Sei il mio male/Come ti vorrei (CGD, N 9600)
 1966 - Dipendesse da me/L'amore è una giostra (Compagnia Generale del Disco, N 9604)
 1966 - Depende de mi/L'amore è una giostra (Music-Hall, 30.524; pubblicato in Argentina)
 1966 - Non prendere la vita così com'è/Un ragazzo che ride (Compagnia Generale del Disco, N 9625)
 1966 - Il mio male/Non prendere la vita così com'è (Compagnia Generale del Disco, N 9634)
 1968 - Imogene/Notte senza fine (RCA Talent, TL1)
 1971 - Fratello ladro/Ma perché (Cinevox, SC 1069)
 1972 - Djamballà (il mio tempo arriverà)/Cena per due (Cinevox, SC 1074)
 1977 - Water closet/Arancione (Mia Records, M 1513)
 1983 - Hey mamma/Brr...che freddo (Strong Records, SR 106)
 2017 - Terra

Participations
 1981 - La storia vera della signora dalle camelie with Petite Creature
 2001 - Come nelle favole with Musica è

References

External links 
 
 Luciana Turina at Discogs

Living people
Italian stage actresses
Italian film actresses
Italian television personalities
Italian women singers
1946 births
Actors from the Province of Mantua
Musicians from the Province of Mantua